Anthony Dale Modra (born 1 March 1969) is a former Australian rules footballer who represented Adelaide and Fremantle in the Australian Football League (AFL) and West Adelaide in the South Australian National Football League (SANFL). Known for his spectacular marking ability in the full forward position, Modra had the physical strength and size to match the best opposition full backs in the competition.

Early life
Modra was born in McLaren Vale, South Australia but grew up nearby in Christies Beach, South Australia and attended Christies Beach Primary School along with a future Adelaide teammate Nigel Smart. He moved to Loxton, South Australia at age 11 with his parents (Douglas and Valerie) and four older siblings (Kerry, Kym, Rick and Joanne). Modra grew up playing multiple sports notably football and soccer for Loxton, both of which he loved equally but solely played football from age 14 which most of his friends played. Growing up Modra supported Glenelg in the SANFL plus St Kilda and Richmond in the VFL.

Early career
Modra first played Under 19s for West Adelaide in 1988 but could not adjust to working and playing football in Adelaide. Modra returned home and in 1989 as a 20-year-old, Tony kicked 76 goals for the Loxton Football Club, Loxton would end up losing the Grand Final to Barmera-Monash.

In 1990 Tony joined his brothers Rick and Kym at the Renmark Rovers Football Club in pursuit of a premiership. Modra lead the team to win the 1990 Riverland Football League in a grand final replay after drawing with Waikerie the previous week. Modra kicked a remarkable 118 goals for the season.

In 1991 Modra attempted to move to Red Cliffs in the Sunraysia Football League and played one pre season game for the club, kicking 13 goals on newly Sydney drafted Darren Holmes.  However Modra was still contracted to West Adelaide and they would not be awarded a fee if Modra was to play in the AFL one day. Due to Red Cliffs being based interstate this fee would not be received if Modra played there. Lawyers from Red Cliffs faced a tribunal in Adelaide but the tribunal rules that Modra was a contracted West Adelaide player. Reluctantly he returned to West Adelaide for the 1991 season, playing in the losing 1991 SANFL Grand Final. He did enough to earn an invite to Adelaide Crows training and then win selection in the squad. Modra was selected in the 1991 AFL Draft as a Zone Selection for the Adelaide Football Club. Modra  played 15 SANFL games for West Adelaide and kicked 46 goals between 1988 and 1991.

AFL career

Adelaide career (1992–1998)
Modra began his AFL career at 23 years of age. At first, his potential at full forward was overshadowed by senior player Scott Hodges who had a reputation as a prolific goal kicker in the SANFL with Port Adelaide Football Club, having broken the record for most goals in a season in 1990 when he kicked 153. Modra played 8 games in his debut season of 1992, kicking 21 goals.

At the start of 1993, an injury to Hodges led to Modra's inclusion at full forward with Adelaide. Modra was an instant success, kicking 10 goals in the opening round against Richmond at Melbourne Cricket Ground and finishing the year as runner up to Geelong's Gary Ablett Sr. in the Coleman Medal with 119 goals in the Home and Away season, kicking an additional 10 in 3 finals.

Both the Crows and Modra had less successful seasons in 1994 through to 1996, although Modra topped the club goalkicking each year. Also in 1994, Modra garnered controversy when he insulted a female flight attendant while on a flight from Hong Kong. Modra apologised for the incident, citing his 'nightlife' as the cause, and was given fines by both the Adelaide Crows and the AFL.

In 1997, Modra won the Coleman Medal for the most goals in the season, and was also selected in the AFL All-Australian team. However a torn Anterior cruciate ligament injury sustained during a marking contest in the preliminary final caused Modra to miss the Crows' first premiership win when they defeated  in the Grand Final.

After returning from the knee injury 10 months later in 1998 he failed to regain form and was not considered for the 1998 AFL Grand Final. He was thus one of the few leading Crows players who did not receive a premiership medallion in either of the Crows premiership years of 1997 and 1998.

Modra's aerial ability was unsurpassed in his prime, and he was nominated for Mark of the Year on numerous occasions, winning the award in 1993, 1997 and 2000.

Fremantle career (1999–2001)
Adelaide traded Modra to Fremantle for the 1999 AFL season.  After kicking a club record 71 goals in his first year at Fremantle, by the middle of the 2001 AFL season sore knees forced him to retire from the AFL at 32 years of age. His career games tally finished at 165 games for 588 goals.

Statistics

|-style="background-color: #EAEAEA"
! scope="row" style="text-align:center" | 1992
|style="text-align:center;"|
| 44 || 8 || 21 || 11 || 41 || 7 || 48 || 24 || 1 || 2.6 || 1.4 || 5.1 || 0.9 || 6.0 || 3.0 || 0.1
|-
! scope="row" style="text-align:center" | 1993
|style="text-align:center;"|
| 6 || 23 || bgcolor="b7e718"| 129 || 61 || 240 || 41 || 281 || 163 || 8 || 5.6 || 2.7 || 10.4 || 1.8 || 12.2 || 7.1 || 0.3
|-style="background-color: #EAEAEA"
! scope="row" style="text-align:center" | 1994
|style="text-align:center;"|
| 6 || 19 || 70 || 39 || 146 || 31 || 177 || 85 || 3 || 3.7 || 2.1 || 7.7 || 1.6 || 9.3 || 4.5 || 0.2
|-
! scope="row" style="text-align:center" | 1995
|style="text-align:center;"|
| 6 || 16 || 42 || 29 || 108 || 25 || 133 || 54 || 4 || 2.6 || 1.8 || 6.8 || 1.6 || 8.3 || 3.4 || 0.3
|-style="background-color: #EAEAEA"
! scope="row" style="text-align:center" | 1996
|style="text-align:center;"|
| 6 || 19 || 75 || 32 || 144 || 13 || 157 || 87 || 12 || 3.9 || 1.7 || 7.6 || 0.7 || 8.3 || 4.6 || 0.6
|-
! scope="row" style="text-align:center" | 1997
|style="text-align:center;"|
| 6 || 25 || bgcolor="DD6E81"| 84 || 45 || 181 || 22 || 203 || 93 || 13 || bgcolor="CFECEC"| 3.4 || 1.8 || 7.2 || 0.9 || 8.1 || 3.7 || 0.5
|-style="background-color: #EAEAEA"
! scope="row" style="text-align:center" | 1998
|style="text-align:center;"|
| 6 || 8 || 19 || 8 || 46 || 13 || 59 || 26 || 3 || 2.4 || 1.0 || 5.8 || 1.6 || 7.4 || 3.3 || 0.4
|-
! scope="row" style="text-align:center" | 1999
|style="text-align:center;"|
| 6 || 20 || 71 || 43 || 166 || 17 || 183 || 81 || 7 || 3.6 || 2.2 || 8.3 || 0.9 || 9.2 || 4.1 || 0.4
|-style="background-color: #EAEAEA"
! scope="row" style="text-align:center" | 2000
|style="text-align:center;"|
| 6 || 16 || 50 || 25 || 109 || 19 || 128 || 62 || 3 || 3.1 || 1.6 || 6.8 || 1.2 || 8.0 || 3.9 || 0.2
|-
! scope="row" style="text-align:center" | 2001
|style="text-align:center;"|
| 6 || 11 || 27 || 15 || 61 || 18 || 79 || 35 || 8 || 2.5 || 1.4 || 5.5 || 1.6 || 7.2 || 3.2 || 0.7
|- class="sortbottom"
! colspan=3| Career
! 165
! 588
! 308
! 1242
! 206
! 1448
! 710
! 62
! 3.6
! 1.9
! 7.5
! 1.2
! 8.8
! 4.3
! 0.4
|}

Post AFL career
Since 2003, Modra has worked as a cattle farmer on his property at Waitpinga, near Victor Harbor with his family, wife Erica and two children, Hayley May and Luke. He resumed playing local football for Encounter Bay in the Great Southern Football League, where he is still affiliated. Modra was recently named in the team of the century for Encounter Bay.  Modra also played for the Prince Alfred Old Collegians Football Club, alongside old team mate Mark Ricciuto in division 4 of the South Australian Amateur Football League. He also plays in charity games such as the West End Slowdown and can still take huge marks. He also plays cricket for the Encounter Bay Cricket Club.

Modra kicked 10 goals against Lucindale on 30 June 2006. Keith won by 119 points.

In his first senior Premiership since he was 21, Modra kicked 8 goals in Keith's win over Penola in the KNTFL Grand Final played at Naracoorte on 15 September 2007. Final scores Keith 19.8 (122) defeated Penola 10.10 (70)

In May 2011, it was reported that Modra was considering a return to the AFL as a coach with Adelaide.

On 3 October 2011 Modra, along with other former AFL and SANFL stars such as Andrew and Darren Jarman, Gavin Wanganeen, Mark Ricciuto, Ben Hart, Mick Martyn, Brendan Fevola, Matthew Lloyd and Dermott Brereton played in the State of Origin Slowdown match at the Adelaide Oval between South Australia and Victoria. The match was played for charity for the Little Heroes Foundation and saw SA run out winners 17.10 (112) to Victoria's 17.9 (111) on a goal 20 seconds from the final siren by Darren Jarman.

On 6 October 2015 at the age of 46, Modra competed in the annual slowdown match at the Adelaide Oval, where he produced an amazing mark, gaining media attention. 

In late 2021, Modra made the move to Queensland where he linked up with his old Fitness Coach Karli Owen, who ran him through a rigorous 6 month program that allowed him to return to SA and take up a role within the Glenelg Masters. He attributed his breakout season to Karli and her strict training regime for his return to his former glory.

References

External links

1969 births
Living people
Coleman Medal winners
Adelaide Football Club players
West Adelaide Football Club players
Fremantle Football Club players
South Australian State of Origin players
All-Australians (AFL)
Australian rules footballers from Adelaide
South Australian Football Hall of Fame inductees
Christies Beach Football Club players